The term e-Research (alternately spelled eResearch) refers to the use of information technology to support existing and new forms of research. This extends cyber-infrastructure practices established in STEM fields such as e-Science to cover other all research areas, including HASS fields such as digital humanities.

Principles

Practices in e-Research typically aim to improve efficiency, interconnectedness and scalability across the full research data lifecycle: collection, storage, analysis, visualisation and sharing of data.

E-Research therefore involves collaboration of researchers (often in a multi-disciplinary team), with data scientists and computer scientists, data stewards and digital librarians, and significant information and communication technology infrastructure.

In addition to human resources, it often requires the physical infrastructure for data-intensive activities, often using high performance computing systems such as grid computing.

Applications
Examples of e-Research problems range across disciplines which include:

 Modelling of ecosystems or economies
 Exploration of human genome structures
 Studies of large linguistic corpora
 Integrated social policy analyses

In Australia
Specialist services, centres or programmes instituted to support Australian data and technology intensive research operate under the umbrella term: eResearch.  In March 2012, representatives from these eResearch groups came together to discuss the need build a "collaborative program to strengthen eResearch and address issues facing the sector nationally".  The Australian eResearch Organisation (AeRO) emerged from this forum as "a collaborative organisation of national and state-based research organisations to advance eResearch implementation and innovation in Australia".  Professionals working in Australian eResearch annually convene a conference known as: eResearch Australasia.

See also
 Berkeley Open Infrastructure for Network Computing (BOINC)
 e-Science

References

External links
New Zealand eScience Infrastructure (NeSI)
Centre for eResearch, University of Auckland
eResearch, the University of Michigan
Research Paper Service
Oxford e-Research Centre
Centre for eResearch and Digital Innovation (CeRDI) at Federation University
University of Cape Town eResearch Centre

Research
Information technology